Konow is a village in Sarvestan Rural District, in the Central District of Sarvestan County, Fars Province, Iran. At the 2006 census, its population was 409, in 91 households.

References 

Populated places in Sarvestan County